Dendrelaphis caudolineolatus, commonly known as the striped bronzeback, is a species of snake of the family Colubridae.

Geographic range
The snake is found in Sri Lanka and India.

References 

Reptiles described in 1869
Taxa named by Albert Günther
Reptiles of Sri Lanka
Colubrids
caudolineolatus